The Limited Liability Partnerships Act (Northern Ireland) 2002 is an Act of the Northern Ireland Assembly which introduced the concept of the limited liability partnership into Northern Irish law, passed two years after the Limited Liability Partnerships Act 2000 introduced the concept into the law of England and Wales and Scots law.

It created an LLP as a body with legal personality separate from its members (unlike a normal partnership) which is governed under a hybrid system of law partially from company law and partially from partnership law. Unlike normal partnerships the liability of members of LLP on winding up is limited to the amount of capital they contributed to the LLP.

Currently, despite the passing of the Companies Act 2006 and its gradual entry into force, the new law does not apply to LLP's. The commencement orders for the Companies Act 2006 have so far included saving provisions for the provisions of the Companies (Northern Ireland) Order 1986 to remain in force as applied to LLP's.

External links

2002 in Northern Ireland
Acts of the Northern Ireland Assembly
2002 in British law